The 2004–05 New Zealand Figure Skating Championships was held in Queenstown from 20 through 23 September 2004. Skaters competed in the disciplines of men's singles and ladies' singles across many levels, including senior, junior, novice, adult, and the pre-novice disciplines of juvenile, pre-primary, primary, and intermediate.

Senior results

Men

Ladies

External links
 2004–05 New Zealand Figure Skating Championships results

2004 in figure skating
New Zealand Figure Skating Championships
Figure Skating
September 2004 sports events in New Zealand